The Eagle Has Landed is the first live album by heavy metal band Saxon and the first album featuring their long time drummer Nigel Glockler. It was recorded during the European leg of the world tour supporting the album Denim and Leather and released in 1982. The album reached #5 in the UK charts.

It won the British Heavy Metal live 1982 Award.

Track listing

Bonus tracks recorded live at Hammersmith Odeon, 1981–82.

Personnel 
 Biff Byford – vocals
 Graham Oliver – guitar
 Paul Quinn – guitar
 Steve Dawson – bass
 Nigel Glockler – drums

 Production
 Saxon – producer
 Andy Lydon – engineer
 Steward Eales – engineer
 UK and Europe – recording locations
 The Mobile – recording equipment
 Manor and Bray Sound Studio – mixing location

Charts

Certifications

References

Saxon (band) live albums
Live New Wave of British Heavy Metal albums
1982 live albums